98.9 FM (callsign 4AAA) is a community radio station that caters to the Aboriginal and Torres Strait Islander communities in metropolitan Brisbane, Queensland.

See also
 List of radio stations in Australia

References

Radio stations in Brisbane
Community radio stations in Australia
Radio stations established in 1993
1993 establishments in Australia